Andrzej Marian Olechowski (born 9 September 1947) is a Polish politician. He was one of the co-founders of liberal conservative party Civic Platform in 2001 with Maciej Płażyński and Donald Tusk. He served as Minister of Finance (1992) in the Jan Olszewski's Government and Minister of Foreign Affairs (1993–1995) in the Waldemar Pawlak's Government.

Olechowski was an independent candidate in 2000 presidential election, coming second after incumbent Aleksander Kwaśniewski. In 2002, he was Civic Platform's candidate for president of Warsaw but failed to even get to the second round. Afterwards he began moving away from politics.

He left the Civic Platform in July 2009 and started co-operating with the Democratic Party. He was one of the candidates in the 2010 Polish presidential election, but got only 1.44% of votes and didn't get into the second round.

Director of Euronet, USA.
2005 functions
 Supervisory Boards of Citibank Handlowy and Europejski Fundusz Hipoteczny;
Senior Advisor, Central Europe Trust Polska;
Director, Studiam Generale Europa;
Chairman, Citizens for the Republic.
President of The Central European Forum
Activities
former Minister of Foreign Affairs (1993–95)of the Republic of Poland
former Minister of Finance (1992) of the Republic of Poland.
Chairman of the City Council in Wilanow (1994–98);
Economic Advisor to President Walesa (1992–93; 1995);
Secretary of State, Ministry of Foreign Economic Relations (1991–92);
Deputy Governor, National Bank of Poland (1989–91);
Director of Department, Ministry of Foreign Economics Relations (1988–89) and National Bank of Poland (1987–88);
Economist, The World Bank, Washington, D.C. (1985–87);
Economic Affairs Officer, UNCTAD, Geneva (1982–84);
Department Head, Foreign Trade Research Institute (1978–82).
Education
Central School of Planning and Statistics in Warsaw (PhD, 1979)
Attended the Graduate Institute of International and Development Studies, Geneva
Fellow of Collegium Invisibile.

References

External links
 Andrzej Olechowski

1947 births
Civic Platform politicians
Living people
Politicians from Kraków
Finance Ministers of Poland
Ministers of Foreign Affairs of Poland
Polish United Workers' Party members
Candidates in the 2000 Polish presidential election
Candidates in the 2010 Polish presidential election
Fellows of Collegium Invisibile
Graduate Institute of International and Development Studies alumni
Polish Round Table Talks participants
Political party founders